The 1934-35 French Rugby Union Championship of first division was won by Biarritz that beat Perpignan in the final.

The tournament was played by 42 clubs divided in six pools of seven clubs.

Sixteen Club were qualified for the "second round" .

Context 
The La ligue française de rugby – XIII played its first competition.
The 1935 International Championship was won by Ireland.

The France was excluded.

Semifinals

Final

External links
 Compte rendu de la finale de 1935, sur lnr.fr

1935
France|France
Championship